Bengaluru FC Futsal is an Indian professional futsal club which is part of Bengaluru FC and is based in Bengaluru, Karnataka. The club competes in Karnataka Futsal League and Futsal Club Championship, the highest level of futsal club competition in India.

History
In December 2019, the AIFF executive committee had announced that a new futsal club tournament will be held annually and had also invited ISL clubs to participate., but due to COVID pandemic the tournament was postponed and rescheduled for 2021. On 15 October 2021, Bengaluru FC emerged as the only ISL club to have announced participation.

Recent seasons

Squad

Bengaluru FC had announced 18-man squad for their inaugural campaign at AIFF Futsal Club Championship.

See also
Bengaluru FC Reserves and Academy

References

External links 
 AIFF Futsal

Bengaluru FC
Futsal clubs in India
2021 establishments in India
2021 in Asian futsal